Eileen Givens is a former American politician from California. Givens is a former mayor of Glendale, California.

Early life 
Givens was born as Eileen Hadley. Givens' father was Wayne E. Hadley. Givens' mother was Shirley McKay Hadley (1923-1912).

Givens' maternal grandfather was Douglas McKay, former Oregon governor and U.S. interior secretary.

Career 
In April 1994, Givens became the mayor of Glendale, California, until April 1995.

On April 4, 1995, Givens won the election and continued serving as a member of city council for Glendale, California. Givens received 39.69% of the votes.

In April 1998, Givens became the mayor of Glendale, California, until April 1999.

Givens is the author of I Baked a Cake for Ike and Mamie!, a memoir of her grandfather Douglas McKay.

Personal life 
Givens' husband is Jim Givens. Givens and her family lives in McMinnville, Oregon.

References

External links 
 Eileen Givens at ourcampaigns.com
 Eileen Givens at alextheatre.org

Living people
Mayors of Glendale, California
California city council members
Women city councillors in California
Women mayors of places in California
Year of birth missing (living people)
21st-century American women